= Maharashtra Arthik Vikas Mahamandal =

Mahila Arthik Vikas Mahamandal (MAVIM)
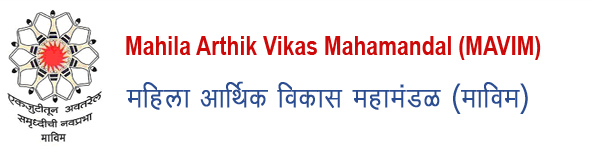
- Founded: 1975
- Type: Government Department
- Purpose: Women Empowerment
- Location: Mumbai, India
- Region served: Maharashtra
- Website: mavimindia.org/who-we-are/about-mavim/

The Maharashtra Arthik Vikas Mahamandal (MAVIM) is a government agency dedicated to women's development throughout the Indian state of Maharashtra.

== Programs ==
Since its founding in 1975, MAVIM has offered various empowerment programs. MAVIM specifically aimed to empower marginalized women, rural and urban, into self-help groups, where they achieve social, economic and political empowerment. MAVIM acts as the medium between self-help groups, financial institutions and government agencies. MAVIM’s guiding philosophy is to empower women as a means to women’s development. It works to ensure delivery of the government guidelines for nutrition of pregnant women and children.

== Published works ==
- Supervision report :Tejaswini: Maharashtra Rural Women’s Empowerment Programme by IFAD
- A Study of Quality and Sustainability SHGs Promoted By Government Organizations by International Journal of Engineering Technology Science and Research IJETSR
- Krishnaraj, Maithreyi (1997-11-01). "Gender Issues in Disaster Management: The Latur Earthquake". Gender, Technology and Development. 1 (3): 395–411. doi:10.1177/097185249700100304. ISSN 0971-8524.

== Awards ==
- 2015 Gender Award for Tejaswini Maharashtra Rural Women Empowerment Program, India
